The Netherlands Antilles competed in the Summer Olympic Games for the first time at the 1952 Summer Olympics in Helsinki, Finland.  The Caribbean nation, then a colonial territory of the Netherlands, was represented by their association football team.

Football 

The Netherlands Antilles national football team was one of 25 teams entered in the tournament.  They lost their first round match to Turkey and were eliminated from the tournament.

Squad
Ergilio Hato (gk)
Pedro Matrona
Wilfred de Lanoi
Wilhelm Canword
Guillermo Giribaldi
Edmundo Vlinder
Adriaan Brokke
Jorge Brion
Juan Briezen
Willys Heyliger
Guillermo Krips

Match results

References

Nations at the 1952 Summer Olympics
1952
1952 in the Netherlands Antilles